Magnus Arvidsson (born 20 February 1983) is a retired Swedish track and field athlete who competed in the javelin throw.

He finished tenth at the 2006 European Championships, tenth at the 2007 World Championships, third at the 2007 World Athletics Final and eleventh at the 2008 Olympic Games.

Arvidsson retired at the age of 28 in April 2011.

Achievements

Seasonal bests by year
2000 - 
2001 - 
2002 - 
2003 - 
2004 - 
2005 - 
2006 - 
2007 - 
2008 - 
2009 -

References

1983 births
Living people
Swedish male javelin throwers
Athletes (track and field) at the 2008 Summer Olympics
Olympic athletes of Sweden